The following list shows the recipients for the Country Music Association Award for Album of the Year. George Strait has won the most awards. Other artists with multiple wins are Johnny Cash, Merle Haggard, Charlie Rich, Ronnie Milsap, Willie Nelson, Garth Brooks, Tim McGraw, Miranda Lambert, Eric Church and Chris Stapleton.

Recipients

Notes 
A. Award presented to: Norman Blake, The Fairfield Four, Emmylou Harris, John Hartford, James Carter and the Prisoners, Chris Thomas King, Alison Krauss, Harry McClintock, Sarah Peasall, Hannah Peasall, Leah Peasall, Soggy Bottom Boys, Stanley Brothers, Ralph Stanley, Gillian Welch and The Whites 
B. Award presented to: John Anderson, Clint Black, Suzy Bogguss, Brooks & Dunn, Billy Dean, Diamond Rio, Vince Gill, Alan Jackson, Little Texas, Lorrie Morgan, Travis Tritt, Tanya Tucker and Trisha Yearwood 
C. Nominees were: Chet Atkins, Clint Black, Natalie Cole, Vince Gill, Al Green, George Jones, B.B. King, Gladys Knight, Patti LaBelle, Little Richard, Lyle Lovett, Reba McEntire, Sam Moore, Aaron Neville, The Pointer Sisters, The Staple Singers, Marty Stuart, Allen Toussaint, Travis Tritt, Tanya Tucker, Conway Twitty, Trisha Yearwood

Category Facts

Most Wins

Most Nominations

References

Country Music Association Awards
Album awards